Taciba is a municipality in the state of São Paulo in Brazil. The population is 6,329 (2020 est.) in an area of 607 km². The elevation is 416 m.

References

Municipalities in São Paulo (state)